Gaga is an Israeli form of dodgeball.

Gaga, ga-ga, GAGA and other variants, may also refer to:

People
 Gaga Chkhetiani (born 1983), Georgian footballer currently playing in Israel
 Lady Gaga (born 1986), American singer, songwriter, and actress

Arts, entertainment, and media 
 Gaga (dance vocabulary)
 "Radio Ga Ga", a 1984 song by Queen
 Rara, a type of Haitian music called Gagá in the Dominican Republic
 Gaga (film), a 2022 Taiwanese film

Other uses 
 Gaga – village in Central African Republic
 Gaga (company), a video game publisher; see Dark Seed (video game)
 gaga, an informal English word meaning 'senile', 'insane' or 'infatuated'
 Gaga (god), a minor Babylonian deity
 Gaga (plant), a genus of fern named for Lady Gaga
 Gaga, a dialect of the Franco-Provençal language spoken in the region around Saint-Étienne, France